The Inco Superstack in Sudbury, Ontario, with a height of , is the tallest chimney in Canada and the Western hemisphere, and the second-tallest freestanding chimney in the world after the GRES-2 Power Station in Kazakhstan. It is also the second-tallest freestanding structure of any type in Canada, behind the CN Tower but ahead of First Canadian Place. As of 2023, it is the 51st-tallest freestanding structure in the world. The Superstack is located on top of the largest nickel smelting operation in the world at Vale's Copper Cliff processing facility in the city of Greater Sudbury.

In 2018, Vale announced that the stack would be decommissioned and dismantled, beginning in 2020. Two new, smaller stacks were constructed under the company's Clean Atmospheric Emissions Reduction Project. In July 2020, Vale announced that the Superstack had been officially taken out of service, but would remain operational in standby mode for two more months as a backup in the event of a malfunction in the new system, following which the dismantling of the Superstack would begin. As of August 2021, however, Vale has not yet announced the awarding of a demolition contract on the Superstack, and it remains unknown when demolition will actually begin.

In addition to further reducing sulphur dioxide emissions by 85 per cent, the decommissioning of the stack is expected to cut the complex's natural gas consumption in half.

History
The Superstack was built by Inco Limited (and later purchased by Vale) at an estimated cost of 25 million dollars. Construction on the structure was underway during the Sudbury tornado of August 20, 1970; the structure swayed heavily in the wind, but remained standing and suffered only minor damage. Six workers were on top of the construction platform when the storm hit, and all survived. The same day was the final day of construction on the stack, with the construction fully completed by the evening of August 21, 1970.

The stack entered into full operation in 1972. From the date of its completion until the Ekibastuz GRES-2 chimney was constructed in 1987, it was the world's tallest smokestack. Between the years 1972–75 it was the tallest freestanding structure in Canada.

Prior to the construction of the Superstack, the waste gases contributed to severe local ecological damage. The Copper Cliff smelter was already home to some of the world's tallest stacks, including two  chimneys constructed in 1928-29 and 1936. However, these proved to be insufficient and compounded by open coke beds in the early to mid-20th century and logging for fuel, an inevitable near-total loss of native vegetation occurred. Of particular interest to geologists are the now exposed rocky outcrops, which have been permanently stained charcoal black, first by the pollution wafting over the decades from the roasting yards, then by the acid rain in a layer which penetrates up to three inches into the once pink-grey granite.

The Superstack was built to disperse sulphur gases and other byproducts of the smelting process away from the city of Sudbury. It did this by placing the gases high in the air, where they normally blew right past the city on the prevailing winds. As a result, these gases can be detected in the atmosphere around Greater Sudbury in a  radius of the Inco plant. During the 1970s and 80s, the sulphur dioxide plume formed a permanent, opaque, cloud-like formation running across the entire horizon as seen from a distance. Periodic inversions would cause the plume to fall into the city.

Construction of the Superstack was followed by an environmental reclamation project which has included rehabilitation of existing landscapes and selected water bodies such as Lake Ramsey. An ambitious regreening plan has seen over three million new trees planted within the Greater Sudbury area. In 1992, Inco and the city were given an award by the United Nations in honour of their environmental rehabilitation programmes.

On November 3, 2014, Vale announced that they may decide to stop using the stack, following a $1 billion project to reduce emissions by 85% that negates the need for the stack. If no other use for it is found, Vale may decommission the superstack, demolish it, and replace it with a much smaller chimney. In 2017, Vale announced plans to decommission the Superstack upon the construction of two smaller, more energy efficient stacks. On July 28, 2020, Vale updated that news, stating that the stack at its Copper Cliff Complex had been taken out of service. It would remain on "hot standby" for about two months while the replacement flue connections were tested but the stack would then be demolished over the years.

Emissions

While the Superstack lowered the ground-level pollution in the city, it has dispersed sulphur dioxide, and nitrogen dioxide gases over a much larger area. Though not the single source of lake acidification, it appears even the heavily industrialized Ohio Valley has contributed to the ecological problem of lakes as far north as northern Ontario. Research from data gleaned up to the late 1980s demonstrated acid rain to have affected the biology of some 7,000 lakes.

Prior to Vale's purchase of Inco, a major construction effort by Inco in the early 1990s dramatically scrubbed waste gases before pumping them up the Superstack. These upgrades were completed in 1994 and emissions from then on have been much reduced. By comparison to the plume prior to installation, the plume now disperses quite rapidly and is often see-through even at the stack site.

Emissions reductions and increases in thermal efficiency have reached the point where natural draught is no longer sufficient to draw flue gas up the stack, necessitating the use of induced draught fans and/or reheating of the flue gas using natural gas burners.

In contrast to the reduction of SO2 emissions, Inco's Superstack stands out in North America in its arsenic, nickel and lead emissions to the atmosphere. Using data compiled by the Commission for Environmental Cooperation, Inco alone accounts for 20% of all of the arsenic emitted in North America, 13% of the lead and 30% of the nickel. Although it is not strictly fair to compare a nickel-copper smelter to a lead smelter, by so doing one can get an idea of how poor the containment of lead is at Copper Cliff. In 1998, Inco emitted 146.7 tonnes of lead at Copper Cliff with a smelter production of 238,500 tonnes of nickel-copper matte. The EPA regulations in the United States require a primary lead smelter to limit emissions of lead to 3.0 gm per tonne  of product. With this emission factor, Copper Cliff would be required to limit emissions of lead to approximately 1 tonne per year, demonstrating that the actual emission is about 150 times greater than allowed by US regulations for a lead smelter. Even with the 85% reduction postulated by Hatch, Inco would still emit 10 tonnes per year of lead, or four times the amount allowed by the EPA for a lead smelter.

As a result of the excessive lead emissions from the Inco Superstack, the surrounding community of Copper Cliff was found to have levels of lead in soil tests at a level sufficient to cause harm to young children.

See also

 List of chimneys
 List of tallest freestanding structures in the world

References

External links

 
 
 Inco Air Quality Site
 CVRD Inco plugs sulphur dioxide holes
 Drone video 'A View Rarely Seen' of INCO Superstack

Towers completed in 1970
Buildings and structures in Greater Sudbury
Chimneys in Canada
Metallurgical facilities
Industrial buildings in Ontario
1970 establishments in Ontario